This is a list of schools in Staffordshire, England

State-funded schools

Primary schools 

All Saints CE Academy, Denstone
All Saints CE First School, Church Leigh
All Saints CE First School, Leek
All Saints CE First School, Standon
All Saints CE Primary School, Alrewas
All Saints CE Primary School, Bednall
All Saints CE Primary School, Rangemore
All Saints CE Primary School, Ranton
All Saints CE Primary School, Trysull
Alsagers Bank Primary Academy, Alsagers Bank
Amington Heath Primary School, Amington
Anglesey Primary Academy, Burton upon Trent
Anker Valley Primary Academy, Tamworth
Ankermoor Primary Academy, Bolehall
Anson CE Primary School, Great Haywood
Ashcroft Infants' School, Tamworth
Baldwin's Gate CE Primary School, Baldwin's Gate
Barlaston CE First School, Barlaston
Barnfields Primary School, Stafford
Beresford Memorial CE First School, Leek
Berkswich CE Primary School, Walton-on-the-Hill
Betley CE Primary School, Betley
Bhylls Acre Primary School, Penn
Birches First School, Codsall
Bird's Bush Primary School, Tamworth
Bishop Lonsdale CE Primary Academy, Eccleshall
Bishop Rawle CE Primary School, Cheadle
Blackshaw Moor CE First School, Blackshaw Moor
Blakeley Heath Primary School, Wombourne
Blessed Mother Teresa's RC Primary School, Stafford
Blessed Robert Sutton RC Voluntary Academy, Stapenhill
Boney Hay Primary Academy, Burntwood
Bramshall Meadows First School, Uttoxeter
Bridgtown Primary School, Bridgtown
Brindley Heath Academy, Kinver
Bursley Academy, Bradwell
Burton Fields School, Burton upon Trent
Burton Manor Primary School, Stafford
Castle Primary School, Mow Cop
Castlechurch Primary School, Stafford
Chadsmead Primary Academy, Lichfield
Chadsmoor CE Junior School, Chadsmoor
Chadsmoor Community Infants School, Chadsmoor
Chancel Primary School, Rugeley
Charnwood Primary Academy, Lichfield
Chase Terrace Primary School, Burntwood
Chase View Community Primary School, Rugeley
Cheadle Primary School, Cheadle
Cheslyn Hay Primary School, Cheslyn Hay
Chesterton Primary School, Chesterton
Christ Church CE First School, Stone
Christ Church CE Primary School, Lichfield
Christ Church Primary School, Burton upon Trent
Church Eaton Primary School, Church Eaton
Churchfield CE Primary Academy, Rugeley
Churchfields Primary School, Chesterton
Colwich CE Primary School, Colwich
Co-op Academy Friarswood, Newcastle-under-Lyme
Cooper Perry Primary School, Seighford
Corbett CE Primary School, Bobbington
Coton Green Primary School, Tamworth
Crackley Bank Primary School, Newcastle-under-Lyme
The Croft Primary School, Armitage
Dilhorne Endowed CE Primary School, Dilhorne
Dosthill Primary School, Tamworth
Dove Bank Primary School, Kidsgrove
Dove CE Academy, Uttoxeter
Doxey Primary School, Doxey
Edge Hill Academy, Stapenhill
Ellison Primary Academy, Wolstanton
Endon Hall Primary School, Endon
Etching Hill CE Primary Academy, Rugeley
Eton Park Junior, Burton upon Trent
Glenthorne Community Primary School, Cheslyn Hay
The Faber RC Primary School, Cotton
Featherstone Academy, Featherstone
Five Spires Academy, Lichfield
Five Ways Primary School, Heath Hayes
Flash Ley Primary School, Stafford
Flax Hill Junior Academy, Tamworth
Florendine Primary School, Amington
Foley Infant School Academy, Kinver
Forest Hills Primary School, Rugeley
Forsbrook CE Primary School, Blythe Bridge
Fradley Park Primary School, Fradley
Fulfen Primary School, Burntwood
Fulford Primary School, Fulford
Gentleshaw Primary Academy, Gentleshaw
Glascote Academy, Tamworth
Glenthorne Community Primary School, Cheslyn Hay
Gnosall St Lawrence CE Primary Academy, Gnosall
Gorsemoor Primary School, Heath Hayes
Grange School, Burton upon Trent
Great Wood Community Primary School, Upper Tean
Green Lea First School, Milwich
Greysbrooke Primary School, Shenstone
Hanbury's Farm Community Primary School, Tamworth
Hassell Primary School, Newcastle-under-Lyme
Haughton St Giles CE Primary Academy, Haughton
Havergal CE Primary School, Shareshill
Hayes Meadow Primary School, Handsacre
Hazel Slade Primary Academy, Hazelslade
Heath Hayes Primary Academy, Heath Hayes
Heathfields Infant Academy, Tamworth
Hempstalls Primary School, Newcastle-under-Lyme
Henhurst Ridge Primary Academy, Burton upon Trent
Henry Chadwick Primary School, Rugeley
Highfields Primary Academy, Burntwood
Hob Hill CE/Methodist Primary School, Brereton
Hollinsclough CE Academy, Hollinsclough
Holly Grove Primary Academy, Burntwood
Holy Rosary RC Voluntary Academy, Burton upon Trent
Holy Trinity CE Primary School, Burton upon Trent
Horninglow Primary, Burton upon Trent
Horton St Michael's CE First School, Horton
The Howard Primary School, Elford
Hugo Meynell CE Primary School, Loggerheads
Hutchinson Memorial CE First School, Checkley
Ilam CE Primary School, Ilam
Jerome Primary School, Norton Canes
The John Bamford Primary School, Rugeley
John of Rolleston Primary School, Rolleston on Dove
John Wheeldon Primary Academy, Stafford
Kidsgrove Primary School, Kidsgrove
Kingsfield First School, Biddulph
Knutton St Marys CE Academy, Knutton
Knypersley First School, Biddulph
Lakeside Primary School, Tamworth
Landau Forte Academy Greenacres, Amington
Landywood Primary School, Landywood
Lane Green First School, Bilbrook
Langdale Primary School, Newcastle-under-Lyme
Lansdowne, Burton upon Trent
Lark Hall Infant Academy, Tamworth
Leasowes Primary School, Stafford
Leek First School, Leek
Little Aston Primary Academy, Little Aston
Littleton Green Community School, Huntington
Longford Primary Academy, Cannock
Longwood Primary School, Fazeley
Manifold CE Primary School, Warslow
Manor Hill First School, Walton
Manor Primary Academy, Drayton Bassett
Marshbrook First School, Penkridge
Mary Howard CE Primary School, Tamworth
May Bank Infants' School, Newcastle-under-Lyme
The Meadows Primary School, Madeley Heath
Meir Heath Academy, Meir Heath
Millfield Primary School, Fazeley
Moat Hall Primary Academy, Great Wyrley
Moor First School, Biddulph Moor
Moorgate Primary Academy, Tamworth
Moorhill Primary School, Cannock
The Mosley Academy, Anslow
Needwood CE Primary School, Newborough
Norton Canes Primary Academy, Norton Canes
Oakhill Primary School, Tamworth
Oakridge Primary School, Stafford
Oulton CE First School, Oulton
Our Lady and St Werburghs RC Primary School, Newcastle-under-Lyme
Our Lady of Grace RC Academy, Biddulph
Outwoods Primary School, Burton upon Trent
Oxhey First School, Biddulph
Parkside Primary School, Stafford
Perton First School, Perton
Perton Primary Academy, Perton
Picknalls First School, Uttoxeter
Pirehill First School, Walton
Poppyfield Primary Academy, Hednesford
Princefield First School, Penkridge
Pye Green Academy, Hednesford
Ravensmead Primary School, Bignall End
Redbrook Hayes Community Primary School, Rugeley
Redhill Primary School, Chadsmoor
The Reginald Mitchell Primary School, Butt Lane
The Richard Clarke First School, Abbots Bromley
The Richard Crosse CE Primary School, Kings Bromley
Richard Wakefield CE Primary Academy, Tutbury
Ridgeway Primary Academy, Burntwood
Riverview Primary School, Burton upon Trent
Rowley Park Primary Academy, Stafford
Rushton CE First School, Rushton Spencer
Rykneld Primary School, Branston
St Andrew's CE Primary School, Clifton Campville
St Andrew's CE Primary School, Weston
St Anne's CE Primary School, Brown Edge
St Anne's RC Primary School, Stafford
St Augustine's CE Academy, Draycott in the Clay
St Austin's RC Primary School, Stafford
St Bartholomew's CE School, Longnor
St Benedict Biscop CE Primary School, Wombourne
St Bernadette's RC Primary School, Wombourne
St Chad's CE Primary School, Lichfield
St Chad's CE Primary School, Pattingham
St Chad's CE Primary School, Red Street
St Christopher's RC Primary Academy, Codsall
St Dominic's RC Primary School, Stone
St Edward's CE Academy, Cheddleton
St Elizabeth's RC Primary School, Tamworth
St Filumena's RC Primary School, Blythe Bridge
St Gabriel's RC Primary School, Tamworth
St Giles and St George's CE Academy, Newcastle-under-Lyme
St Giles' RC Primary School, Cheadle
St James CE Primary Academy, Longdon
St John the Evangelist RC Primary, Kidsgrove
St John's CE First School, Bishops Wood
St John's CE Primary Academy, Stafford
St John's CE Primary School, Keele
St John's CE Primary School, Swindon
St John's CE Primary School, Wetley Rocks
St John's Primary Academy, Essington
St John's RC Primary School, Great Haywood
St Joseph and St Theresa RC Primary, Burntwood
St Joseph's RC Primary School, Hednesford
St Joseph's RC Primary School, Lichfield
St Joseph's RC Primary School, Rugeley
St Joseph's RC Primary School, Uttoxeter
St Leonard's CE First School, Dunston
St Leonard's CE First School, Ipstones
St Leonard's CE Primary School, Wigginton
St Leonard's Primary School, Stafford
St Luke's CE Academy, Endon
St Luke's CE Primary School, Cannock
St Luke's CE Primary School, Silverdale
St Margaret's CE Junior School, Wolstanton
St Mary and St Chad CofE First School, Brewood
St Mary's CE First Academy, Wheaton Aston
St Mary's CE First School, Uttoxeter
The St Mary's CE Primary School, Colton
St Mary's CE Primary School, Market Drayton
St Mary's RC Academy, Leek
St Mary's RC Primary School, Brewood
St Mary's RC Primary School, Cannock
St Mary's RC Primary School, Newcastle-under-Lyme
St Michael's CE First School, Penkridge
St Michael's CE First School, Stone
St Michael's CE Primary School, Lichfield
St Modwen's RC Primary School, Horninglow
St Nicholas CE First School, Codsall
St Patrick's RC Primary School, Stafford
St Paul's CE First School, Coven
St Paul's CE Primary School, Stafford
St Peter's CE Academy Alton
St Peter's CE First School, Marchington
St Peter's CE Primary Academy, Hednesford
St Peter's CE Primary Academy, Stonnall
St Peter's CE Primary School, Caverswall
St Peter's CE Primary School, Hixon
St Saviour's CE Academy, Talke
St Stephen's Primary School, Fradley
St Thomas' CE Primary Academy, Kidsgrove
St Thomas' RC Primary School, Tean
St Thomas More RC Primary School, Great Wyrley
St Werburgh's CE Primary School, Kingsley
St Wulstan's RC Primary School, Wolstanton
Ss Peter and Paul RC Primary School, Lichfield
Scientia Academy, Burton upon Trent
Scotch Orchard Primary School, Lichfield
Seabridge Primary School, Newcastle-under-Lyme
Shobnall Primary School, Burton upon Trent
Silkmore Primary Academy, Stafford
Silverdale Primary Academy, Silverdale
Sir John Offley CE Primary School, Madeley
Springcroft Primary School, Blythe Bridge
Springfields First School, Yarnfield
Springhead Primary School, Talke Pits
Springhill Primary Academy, Burntwood
Squirrel Hayes First School, Biddulph
Stoneydelph Primary School, Wilnecote
Streethay Primary School, Lichfield
Sun Academy Bradwell, Newcastle-under-Lyme
Talbot First School, Kingstone
Thomas Barnes Primary School, Hopwas
Thomas Russell Infants School, Barton-under-Needwood
Thomas Russell Junior School, Barton-under-Needwood
Three Peaks Primary Academy, Wilnecote
Thursfield Primary School, Harriseahead
Tillington Manor Primary School, Stafford
Tittensor CE First School, Tittensor
Tower View Primary School, Winshill
Two Gates Primary School, Tamworth
Tynsel Parkes Primary Academy, Uttoxeter
The Valley Primary School, Oakamoor
Veritas Primary Academy, Stafford
Victoria Community School, Burton upon Trent
The Violet Way Academy, Burton upon Trent
Waterhouses CE Primary Academy, Waterhouses
Werrington Primary School, Werrington
West Hill Primary School, Hednesford
Westfield Primary School, Wombourne
Westlands Primary School, Newcastle-under-Lyme
Westwood First School, Leek
Whittington Primary School, Whittington
The William Amory Primary School, Blythe Bridge
William MacGregor Primary School, Tamworth
William Shrewsbury Primary School, Stretton
Willows Primary School, Lichfield
Wilnecote Junior Academy, Wilnecote
Winshill Village Primary School, Winshill
Wood Lane Primary School, Bignall End
Woodcroft Academy, Leek
The Woodlands Community Primary School, Tamworth
Woodseaves CE Primary Academy, Woodseaves
Yoxall St Peter's CE Primary School, Yoxall

Middle schools

Bilbrook CE Middle School, Codsall
Brewood CE Middle Academy, Brewood
Christ Church Academy, Stone
Churnet View Middle School, Leek
Codsall Middle School, Codsall
James Bateman Middle School, Biddulph
Oldfields Hall Middle School, Uttoxeter
Penkridge Middle School, Penkridge
Perton Middle School, Perton
Ryecroft CE Middle School, Rocester
St Edward's CE Academy, Leek
Walton Priory Middle School, Walton
Windsor Park Middle School, Uttoxeter
Woodhouse Academy, Biddulph

Secondary schools 

Abbot Beyne School, Burton upon Trent
Alleyne's Academy, Stone
Biddulph High School, Biddulph
Blessed Robert Sutton Catholic Voluntary Academy, Burton upon Trent
Blessed William Howard Catholic School, Stafford
Blythe Bridge High School, Blythe Bridge
Cannock Chase High School, Cannock
Cardinal Griffin Catholic College, Cannock
Chase Terrace Academy, Burntwood
The Cheadle Academy, Cheadle
Cheslyn Hay Academy, Cheslyn Hay
Chesterton Community Sports College, Chesterton
Clayton Hall Academy, Newcastle-under-Lyme
Codsall Community High School, Codsall
The de Ferrers Academy, Burton upon Trent
Endon High School, Endon
Erasmus Darwin Academy, Burntwood
The Friary School, Lichfield
Great Wyrley Academy, Great Wyrley
The Hart School, Rugeley
JCB Academy, Rocester
John Taylor Free School, Tatenhill
John Taylor High School, Barton-under-Needwood
Kidsgrove Secondary School, Kidsgrove
King Edward VI High School, Stafford
King Edward VI School, Lichfield
The King's Church of England Academy, Kidsgrove
Kingsmead School, Hednesford
Kinver High School, Kinver
Landau Forte Academy Amington, Amington
Landau Forte Academy QEMS, Tamworth
Leek High School, Leek
Madeley High School, Madeley
Moorside High School, Werrington
Nether Stowe School, Lichfield
Newcastle Academy, Newcastle-under-Lyme
Norton Canes High School, Norton Canes
The Orme Academy, Newcastle-under-Lyme
Paget High School, Branston
Painsley Catholic College, Cheadle
Paulet High School, Burton upon Trent
The Rawlett School, Tamworth
The Rural Enterprise Academy, Penkridge
St John Fisher Catholic College, Newcastle-under-Lyme
Sir Graham Balfour School, Stafford
Sir Thomas Boughey Academy, Halmer End
Stafford Manor High School, Stafford
Staffordshire University Academy, Hednesford
Tamworth Enterprise College, Tamworth
Thomas Alleyne's High School, Uttoxeter
Walton High School, Walton-on-the-Hill
Weston Road Academy, Stafford
Westwood College, Leek
The Wilnecote School, Wilnecote
Wolgarston High School, Penkridge
Wombourne High School, Wombourne

Special and alternative schools 

Bailey Street Alternative Provision Academy, Stafford
Blackfriars Academy, Newcastle-under-Lyme
Bridge Short Stay School, Lichfield
Burton PRU, Burton upon Trent
Cedars Short Stay School, Knutton
Chaselea Alternative Provision Academy, Cannock
Chasetown Community School, Chasetown
Cherry Trees School, Wombourne
Cicely Haughton School, Wetley Rocks
Coppice Academy, Newcastle-under-Lyme
The Fountains High School, Stretton
The Fountains Primary School, Stretton
Greenhall, Staford
Hednesford Valley High School, Hednesford
Horton Lodge Community Special School, Rudyard
Kettlebrook Short Stay School, Tamworth
Loxley Hall School, Uttoxeter
Marshlands School, Stafford
The Meadows School, Leek
Merryfields School, Newcastle-under-Lyme
Queens Croft High School, Lichfield
Rocklands School, Lichfield
Saxon Hill Academy, Lichfield
Shenstone Lodge School, Shenstone*
Sherbrook Primary School, Cannock
Springfield School, Leek
Two Rivers High School, Tamworth
Two Rivers Primary School, Tamworth
Walton Hall Academy, Eccleshall
Wightwick Hall School, Compton

*This school is located in Staffordshire, but is for pupils from Sandwell

Further education 

Burton & South Derbyshire College
Buxton & Leek College
Landau Forte Academy Tamworth Sixth Form
Moorlands Sixth Form College
Newcastle-under-Lyme College
South Staffordshire College
Stafford College
Stafford Collegiate

Independent schools

Primary and preparatory schools
Demetae Academy, Newcastle-under-Lyme
Edenhurst Preparatory School, Newcastle-under-Lyme
Yarlet School, Yarlet

Senior and all-through schools
Chase Grammar School, Cannock
Denstone College, Denstone
Lichfield Cathedral School, Lichfield
Newcastle-under-Lyme School, Newcastle-under-Lyme
St Dominic's Grammar School, Brewood
St Dominic's Priory School, Stone
Stafford Grammar School, Stafford

Special and alternative schools

Aurora Hanley School, Abbey Hulton
Bluebell School, Kidsgrove
Compass Community School Staffordshire, Cauldon
Draycott Moor College, Draycott in the Moors
Elm House School, Cheadle
Evergreen, Ipstones
The Haven School, Stafford
Heather Field School, Stafford
Hopedale School, Cheddleton
Huntercombe Hospital School Stafford, Wheaton Aston
JP Alternative Education, Rugeley
Kaleidoscope School, Wolstanton
Longdon Hall School, Longdon Green
Longridge School, Penkridge
Lyme Brook Independent School, Newcastle-under-Lyme
Maple Hayes Hall School, Lichfield
Options Trent Acres School, Kings Bromley
Pace Education, Newcastle-under-Lyme
Parkgate Farm, Ipstones
Peak Education, Audley
Peak Education, Cannock
Peak Education, Gailey
Roaches School, Biddulph
Rugeley School, Blithbury
Stepping Stones School, Tamworth

External links 
Schools - Staffordshire County Council

Staffordshire
Schools in Staffordshire
Schools